3. deild menn is the fourth tier of football in the Faroe Islands. The majority of teams participating in the league are C or D sides of other Faroese clubs. At the end of the season two teams are promoted to 2. deild. There is no relegation from the league, as 3. deild is the lowest league in the Faroese football ladder.

Champions
Source: 

1980: VB II
1981: HB III
1982: HB III
1983: HB III
1984: Streymur
1985: Skála
1986: KÍ II
1987: HB III
1988: VB II
1989: KÍ II
1990: HB III
1991: HB III
1992: VB II
1993: HB III
1994: B71 II
1995: KÍ IV
1996: KÍ IV
1997: GÍ III
1998: B68 III
1999: B36 III
2000: GÍ III
2001: B68 III
2002: Skála II
2003: SÍ
2004: HB III
2005: MB
2006: B36 III
2007: TB II
2008: B71 II
2009: VB/Sumba II
2010: B36 III
2011: FF Giza
2012: KÍ III
2013: B36 III 
2014: Royn
2015: 07 Vestur II
2016: NSÍ III
2017: Undrið FF
2018: KÍ IV
2019: Royn
2020: ÍF II

Teams for the 2020 season

Group A
 07 Vestur II
 B36 III
 B68 III
 EB/Streymur IV
 FC Hoyvík II
 KÍ V

Group B
 EB/Streymur V
 FC Hoyvík III
 NSÍ IV
 KI VI
 Undrið II
 Víkingur IV

Group C
 B71 II
 EB/Streymur III
 KÍ IV
 NSÍ V
 Skála III
 ÍF II

References

External links

4
Far